Alberto García Cabrera (born 9 February 1985) is a Spanish former professional footballer who played as a goalkeeper.

Club career
Born in Barcelona, Catalonia, García made his senior debut with CF Rayo Majadahonda in 2004. He went on to represent UE Sant Andreu, Villarreal CF B, Águilas CF and UE Figueres (the last two in Segunda División B), before joining Real Murcia in the summer of 2007.

Initially assigned to the reserves in Tercera División, García made his first-team – and La Liga – debut on 17 May 2008, starting in a 5–3 home loss against FC Barcelona as his team was already relegated. It was his only appearance of the season.

García was promoted to the main squad in June 2008, but was mainly used as a backup to Juan Elía. On 1 September 2009, he moved to fellow Segunda División club Córdoba CF, being more regularly used.

On 18 June 2013, García terminated his contract with the Andalusians and signed for four years with Sporting de Gijón hours later. On 15 July 2016, he moved to second-tier Getafe CF, agreeing to a two-year deal as a free agent.

On 13 July 2017, after losing his first-choice status to Vicente Guaita, García was loaned to Rayo Vallecano for one year, with an obligatory buyout clause in case of promotion. The following 1 July, he signed a permanent three-year contract with the club.

García announced his retirement at the age of 36, after nearly two years struggling with injuries.

Honours
Rayo Vallecano
Segunda División: 2017–18

References

External links

1985 births
Living people
Spanish footballers
Footballers from Barcelona
Association football goalkeepers
La Liga players
Segunda División players
Segunda División B players
Tercera División players
UE Cornellà players
CF Rayo Majadahonda players
UE Sant Andreu footballers
Villarreal CF B players
Águilas CF players
UE Figueres footballers
Real Murcia Imperial players
Real Murcia players
Córdoba CF players
Sporting de Gijón players
Getafe CF footballers
Rayo Vallecano players